For information on all University of New Orleans sports, see New Orleans Privateers

The New Orleans Privateers women's basketball team is the women's basketball team that represents the University of New Orleans in New Orleans, Louisiana. The team currently competes in the Southland Conference. The Privateers are currently coached by Keeshawn Davenport.

Postseason appearances
The Privateers have made one NCAA Tournament appearance. They have a record of 0–1.

References

External links